, WWV 91, is the common name of a set of five songs for female voice and piano by Richard Wagner,  (Five Poems for a Female Voice). He set five poems by Mathilde Wesendonck while he was working on his opera Tristan und Isolde. The songs, together with the Siegfried Idyll, are the two non-operatic works by Wagner most regularly performed.

History 

The songs are settings of poems by Mathilde Wesendonck, the wife of one of Richard Wagner's patrons. Wagner had become acquainted with Otto Wesendonck in Zürich, where he had fled on his escape from Saxony after the May Uprising in Dresden in 1849. It is sometimes claimed that Wagner and Mathilde had a love affair; in any case, the situation and mutual infatuation certainly contributed to the intensity in the conception of Tristan und Isolde.

Wagner sold the settings to the publisher Schott in 1860 for 1000 francs. The first published version (1862) was titled Fünf Gedichte für eine Frauenstimme (Five poems for a female voice), and the first performance was given at the publisher's residence in Mainz, by the soprano Emilie Genast, accompanied by Hans von Bülow.  No name was given for the author of the texts at the first publication; it was not publicly revealed until after Mathilde's death (1902).  The present order of the songs appears for the first time in the published version, and this has raised doubts as to whether the sequence is a genuine song cycle, or should be regarded simply as a collection of individual pieces.

The songs 

 "" ("The Angel"), composed November 1857
 "" ("Be still!"), composed February 1858
 "" ("In the Greenhouse"), composed May 1858
 "" ("Sorrows"), composed December 1857
 "" ("Dreams"), composed December 1857
Wagner himself called two of the songs "studies" for Tristan und Isolde, using for the first time certain musical ideas that are later developed in the opera. In "" can be heard the roots of the love duet in Act 2, while "" (the last of the five to be composed) uses music later developed extensively for the prelude to Act 3.

Versions 
Wagner initially wrote the songs for female voice and piano alone, but produced an orchestrated version of "Träume", to be performed by chamber orchestra (with violin playing the voice part) beneath Mathilde's window on the occasion of her birthday, 23 December 1857.

Some male singers have sung some of the songs: Lauritz Melchior recorded "" and "Träume" for HMV in 1923, "" has been recorded by tenors Franco Corelli (in French), Plácido Domingo, Jonas Kaufmann, Andrea Bocelli, and the bass Paata Burchuladze. A few have attempted the whole cycle in performance, including René Kollo. Tenor Stuart Skelton recorded the entire cycle in 2018, as did Christoph Prégardien in 2019.

The orchestration of all five songs was completed for large orchestra by Felix Mottl, the Wagner conductor, on 3 August 1893. In 1972 the Italian composer Vieri Tosatti entirely re-orchestrated the songs. In 1976 the German composer Hans Werner Henze produced a chamber version for the songs. Each of the players has a separate part, with some very unusual wind registration. French composer Christophe Looten wrote a transcription for voice and string quartet (Théâtre des Champs-Élysées, Paris, March 2015). In 2013 (the bicentennial of Wagner's birth) the French composer Alain Bonardi released a new version for voice, piano, clarinet and cello, including instrumental interludes with oriental resonant percussions. In the same year, the Chinese-British composer Jeffrey Ching premiered his Wesendonck Sonata, for voice, viola (or cello), and piano. Ching transposed Wagner's original songs so as to form a closed palindromic tonal sequence in the manner of a five-movement sonata, and also added an elaborate obbligato part for viola (or cello), which comments on the poems and adds harmonic and contrapuntal detail to Wagner's accompaniment. A version of the lieder with the original piano accompaniment arranged for string orchestra by David Angell was premiered by the Bourbaki Ensemble in Sydney, Australia in January 2022. Composer Paolo Fradiani arranged a version for chamber ensemble of 11 players.

Clytus Gottwald arranged "Im Treibhaus" and "Träume" for 16-voice choir a cappella in 2004 as Zwei Studien zu "Tristan und Isolde".

References
Notes

Sources
 Millington, Barry (ed.) (2001). "The Wagner Compendium". London: Thames and Hudson. 
 Newman, Ernest (1976a). "The Life of Richard Wagner. Volume II: 1848–1860". Cambridge: Cambridge University Press. 
 Newman, Ernest (1976b). "The Life of Richard Wagner. Volume III: 1859–1866". Cambridge: Cambridge University Press. 
 Vazsonyi, Nicholas (ed.) (2013). The Cambridge Wagner Encyclopaedia. Cambridge: Cambridge University Press.

External links
 
 Die Wesendonck-Lieder / Fünf Gedichte für Frauenstimme und Klavier / Komponist: Richard Wagner (WWV 91) wesendonck.websiteportal.de
 Audio of Jeffrey Ching's Wesendonck Sonata on Ching's official YouTube channel

Song cycles by Richard Wagner
Lieder
1858 compositions
Classical song cycles in German